Kalardiya, also "Dohgaon Kalardiya" is a village in Kamrup rural district of Western Assam. It is located at south bank of river Brahmaputra.

Culture

Language 
Like rest of Kamrup region, Kamrupi dialects are spoken in Kalardia.

Festivals 
Domahi, Amati, Durga Puja, Kali Puja (Shyama Puja), Diwali, Holi, Janmastami, Shivratri etc. are major festivals of the village.

Transport 
The village is well connected to Chaygaon town and National Highway 17 by regular buses and other modes of transport.

See also 
 Bihdia
 Nahira

References

External links 
 

Villages in Kamrup district
Kamrup district
Lower Assam